Shuni is a rural locality (a selo) in Khuninsky Selsoviet, Laksky District, Republic of Dagestan, Russia. The population was 79 as of 2010.

Geography 
Shuni is located 10 km northeast of Kumukh (the district's administrative centre) by road. Turtsi and Kurla are the nearest rural localities.

Nationalities 
Laks live there.

Famous residents 
 Abutalib Gafurov (poet)

References 

Rural localities in Laksky District